Greenala Point is a headland on the south coast of Pembrokeshire, Wales, about a  walk south from Pembroke. As part of the former Stackpole Estate, it was acquired by the National Trust in 1976.

The Pembrokeshire Coast Path passes through the western ramparts of the fort on Greenala Point.

Promontory fort
The Iron Age promontory fort, known as Greenala Point Fort or Greenala Camp is a scheduled monument.
 

Beyond this is a series of three banks and ditches. The Pembrokeshire Coast Path passes through these western ramparts.

There has been coastal erosion, and the fort was once larger; there are traces of defences on at least one of the adjacent stacks.

References

Hillforts in Pembrokeshire
Headlands of Pembrokeshire
Scheduled monuments in Pembrokeshire
National Trust properties in Wales